The R593 road is a regional road in County Cork, Ireland. It travels from the N71 road at Skibbereen to the R586 at Drimoleague.

References

Regional roads in the Republic of Ireland
Roads in County Cork